Nikola Mikhaylov (30 January 1876 – 20 May 1960) was a Bulgarian painter. His work was part of the painting event in the art competition at the 1936 Summer Olympics.

References

1876 births
1960 deaths
20th-century Bulgarian painters
20th-century male artists
Bulgarian painters
Olympic competitors in art competitions
People from Shumen
Male painters